Pyotr Dolgorukov may refer to:
Pyotr Dmitriyevich Dolgorukov (1866–1951), Russian politician
Pyotr Vladimirovich Dolgorukov (1816–1868), Russian historian and journalist